Neqareh Khaneh (also Romanized as Neqāreh Khāneh and Naqāreh Khāneh) is a village in Poshtkuh-e Rostam Rural District, Sorna District, Rostam County, Fars Province, Iran. At the 2006 census, its population was 80, in 17 families.

References 

Populated places in Rostam County